William Carl Doyle (July 30, 1912 – September 4, 1951) was an American professional baseball pitcher who appeared in 51 games in four seasons in Major League Baseball for the Philadelphia Athletics (1935–1936), Brooklyn Dodgers (1939–1940) and St. Louis Cardinals (1940).

Doyle's pro career lasted eight seasons (1935–1941, 1943). In his 51 MLB games pitched, he posted a 6–15 won–lost record and a poor 6.95 earned run average, surrendering 277 hits, 155 bases on balls, and 172 earned runs in 222 innings pitched; he fanned 101. Notably, he was one of four players that Brooklyn traded to the Cardinals on June 12, 1940, in their blockbuster acquisition of slugger Joe Medwick. He managed the Morristown Red Sox of the Mountain States League in 1950.

Doyle died in the city of his birth, Knoxville, Tennessee, of a pulmonary infarction in 1951 at age 39.

References

External links

1912 births
1951 deaths
Baseball players from Knoxville, Tennessee
Brooklyn Dodgers players
Houston Buffaloes players
Knoxville Smokies players
Major League Baseball pitchers
Memphis Chickasaws players
Minor league baseball managers
Philadelphia Athletics players
Rochester Red Wings players
St. Louis Cardinals players
Sportspeople from Knoxville, Tennessee
Williamsport Grays players